The 2019 Atlantic 10 men's soccer tournament, was the 22nd edition of the Atlantic 10 Men's Soccer Tournament. It determined the Atlantic 10 Conference's automatic berth into the 2019 NCAA Division I men's soccer tournament. The tournament was be held from November 9 to November 17, 2019. The semifinal and finals will be hosted by Fordham University with matches being played at Coffey Field in The Bronx, New York.

Rhode Island are the defending tournament champions, and successfully defended their title, beating Dayton, 1–0, in the championship. Rhode Island would go on to be eliminated by Syracuse in the opening round of the NCAA Tournament.

Seeds 

After the regular season games concluded, five teams were in a tie for seventh place in the conference, all with 3-5 records. A series of tiebreakers involving wins and loss records in matches played among the subgroup determined the last two bids into the A10 Tournament as George Mason and Davidson.

Bracket

Results

Quarterfinals

Semifinals

A10 Championship

Statistics

Goalscorers
2 Goals
  Kingsford Adjei – Dayton
1 Goal

  Mateo Alzate – Davidson
  Tunde Akinlosotu – George Mason
  Charlie Booth – Rhode Island
  Jaime DiLuzio – Davidson
  Daniel Dos Santos – Dayton
  Jonas Fjeldberg – Dayton
  Sondre Karterud – Rhode Island
  Noam Kolakofsky – Rhode Island
  Peder Kristiansen – Rhode Island
  Niklas Middrup – Rhode Island
  Ned Morrissett – Davidson
  Celio Pompeu – VCU
  Filippo Ricupati – Fordham
  Grant Robinson – George Mason
  Ryo Shimazaki – VCU
  Filippo Tamburini – Rhode Island
  Stavros Zarokostas – Rhode Island

References

External links 
 2019 Atlantic 10 Men's Soccer Championship

2019
2019 in sports in Missouri
2019 in sports in New York City
2019 in sports in Ohio
2019 in sports in Rhode Island
2019 in sports in Virginia
Atlantic 10 Conference Men's Soccer Tournament